There were four special elections in 2011 to fill vacant seats in the United States House of Representatives.

Two seat switched parties, swapping from Republican to Democratic, and two other seats were held by the same parties.

Summary 

Elections are listed by date and district.

|-
! 
| Chris Lee
| 
| 2008
|  | Incumbent resigned February 9, 2011 due to a personal scandal.New member elected May 24, 2011.Democratic gain.
| nowrap | 

|-
! 
| Jane Harman
| 
| 2000
|  | Incumbent resigned February 28, 2011 to become head of the Woodrow Wilson International Center for Scholars.New member elected July 12, 2011.Democratic hold.
| nowrap | 

|-
! 
| Dean Heller
| 
| 2006
|  | Incumbent resigned May 9, 2011 to join the U.S. Senate.New member elected September 13, 2011.Republican hold.
| nowrap | 

|-
! 
| Anthony Weiner
| 
| 1998
|  | Incumbent resigned June 21, 2011 due to a personal scandal.New member elected September 13, 2011.Republican gain.
| nowrap | 

|}

New York's 26th congressional district

California's 36th congressional district 

Jane Harman resigned on February 28, 2011 to become head of the Woodrow Wilson International Center for Scholars. The special primary election occurred on May 17, 2011. Democrat Janice Hahn received the highest number of votes, with Republican Craig Huey taking second place. Because no candidate received more than 50 percent of the vote in the primary, a special general election was held on July 12, 2011, between the top two vote recipients. The runoff election was won by Janice Hahn.

Nevada's 2nd congressional district

New York's 9th congressional district

See also 
 List of special elections to the United States House of Representatives
 2010 United States Senate elections

References 

 
2011